Leuberic or Lubericus (fl. 680–693) was a 7th-century bishop of Urgell in Catalonia. His presence is recorded at the Councils of Toledo in 683, 688 and 693.

He was bishop in Urgell at the time of the Mohammedan invasion. The diocese of Urgell functioned throughout the entire Islamic occupation of Spain.

He was succeeded by Urbici.

References 

693 deaths
Year of birth unknown
7th-century people of the Visigothic Kingdom
Bishops of Urgell